Buckwheat gateau or Buckwheat torte is a dessert that is a speciality of the Lüneburg Heath region of Lower Saxony in northern Germany.

The gateau consists of layers of cake made from buckwheat flour and heather honey, separated by a fruit layer using yoghurt and cranberries and topped by whipped cream and chocolate shavings.

See also 
 Lower Saxon cuisine
 Black Forest gateau

References 

German cakes
North German cuisine
Lüneburg Heath
Layer cakes
Sponge cakes